Admiral Inglefield may refer to:

Edward Augustus Inglefield (1820–1894), British Royal Navy admiral
Edward Fitzmaurice Inglefield (1861–1945), British Royal Navy rear admiral
Frederick Inglefield (1854–1921), British Royal Navy admiral
Samuel Inglefield (1783–1848), British Royal Navy rear admiral